Justice Chandramauli Kumar Prasad (born 15 July 1949) is the Chairman of the Press Council of India. Prior to his appointment, he served as a Judge of the Supreme Court of India from 8 February 2010 to 14 July 2014.

Early life and education
Prasad undertook school education at Patna High School, from where he passed Secondary School Examination. After graduating in science from Magadh University, Prasad chose to study the noble stream of law and graduated in law from Patna University in 1973. Justice Prasad is married to Mrs. Madhu Rukhaiyar and has three children, two sons and a daughter.

Career
Prasad began his career by enrolling as an Advocate on 27 November 1973 with the Bar Council of Bihar.  He practiced in Civil, Constitutional, Criminal and Service matters at the High Court of judicature at Patna, Bihar and was designated as a Senior Advocate on 17 July 1989. He was appointed the Additional Advocate General of the State of Bihar on 14 December 1993. He was elevated as a permanent Judge of the Patna High Court on 8 November 1994 and was transferred to the Madhya Pradesh High Court on 21 November 1994 from where he was transferred back to Patna High Court on 10 September 2001. He was appointed the acting Chief Justice of Patna High Court from 3 March 2008 to 12 May 2008 and from 17 December 2008 to 15 March 2009. 
He took oath as the Chief Justice of Allahabad High Court on 20 March 2009 and was elevated as a Judge, Supreme Court of India on 8 February 2010 from where he superannuated on 14 July 2014. Thereafter he was appointed Chairman of the Press Council of India on 25 November 2014. Prasad has held various offices including the office of the Vice-President of the English Speaking Union of Commonwealth and the President of the Patna Golf Club. He is an avid golfer and is seen more than often on public holidays at the Delhi Golf Course. Work and family are his priorities and the golf immediately comes thereafter. He plays to the handicap of 14. He is also a visiting professor in G.D.Goenka College. 
He served as the Chairman of the Bihar State Judicial Academy and Member of the Advisory Board to consider the cases of detention under preventive law of the States of Madhya Pradesh and Bihar. 
He is an experienced arbitrator who has done a large number of arbitrations, including international arbitration under BIT, involving individual companies, public sector companies, foreign country and companies and Govt. of India.

Publications
Prasad is the revising author of the 22nd edition of legal classic Ratanlal and Dhirajlal – Code of Criminal Procedure along with Advocate Namit Saxena.

He is also the revising author of the 19th edition of Mulla – Code of Civil Procedure along with Justice Deepak Verma and Advocate Namit Saxena. Both books have been published by reputed publisher Lexis Nexis India.

Notable judgments and opinions
As champion of civil liberty, in Arnesh Kumar v. State of Bihar [(2014) 8 SCC 273], Prasad gave a landmark ruling and very strongly pointed out the blatant misuse of the Sec.498A of IPC in India. Prasad held that no arrest should be made only because the offence is non-bailable and cognizable. Neither should arrest be made in a routine, casual and cavalier manner or on a mere allegation of commission of an offence made against a person. Arrest should only be made after reasonable satisfaction reached after due investigation as to the genuineness of the allegation. The Honorable Court discussed Sec. 41(1) of Cr.P.C. in great detail, and emphasized that for making arrest the police must be satisfied that all the conditions set out in the provision are met. The Honorable Court also condemned the mechanical manner in which the police give reasons for remand, reproduce the reasons in every case, and the casual manner in which the magistrates grant it.

In Vishwa Lochan Madan v. Union of India [(2014) 7 SCC 707], a bench led by Prasad held that fatwas and shariat court decisions were not legally enforceable.

In the case concerning attacks in the city of Mumbai on 26 November 2011; Mohd. Ajmal Amir Kasab v. State of Maharashtra [(2012) 9 SCC 1], Prasad affirmed that the conspiracy for the terrorist activity was hatched certainly in Pakistan while carving out an exception for the settled principle of ‘certain probability’ in criminal jurisprudence.

In Nandlal Wasudeo Badwaik v. Lata Nandlal Badwaik and Anr. (2014) 2 SCC 576), Prasad authored that when there is a conflict between a conclusive proof envisaged under law and a proof based on scientific advancement accepted by the world community to be correct, the latter must prevail over the former.

References

1949 births
Living people
Justices of the Supreme Court of India
Chief Justices of the Allahabad High Court
People from Patna
20th-century Indian judges
21st-century Indian judges